This is a list of the mammal species recorded in Malawi. There are 192 mammal species in Malawi, of which one is critically endangered, two are endangered, four are vulnerable, and eleven are near threatened.

The following tags are used to highlight each species' conservation status as assessed by the International Union for Conservation of Nature:

Some species were assessed using an earlier set of criteria. Species assessed using this system have the following instead of near threatened and least concern categories:

Order: Macroscelidea (elephant-shrews) 

Often called sengis, the elephant shrews or jumping shrews are native to southern Africa. Their common English name derives from their elongated flexible snout and their resemblance to the true shrews.

Family: Macroscelididae (elephant-shrews)
Genus: Elephantulus
Short-snouted elephant shrew, Elephantulus brachyrhynchus LC
 Dusky elephant shrew, Elephantulus fuscus DD
Genus: Petrodromus
 Four-toed elephant shrew, Petrodromus tetradactylus LC
Genus: Rhynchocyon
 Checkered elephant shrew, R. cirnei

Order: Tubulidentata (aardvarks) 

The order Tubulidentata consists of a single species, the aardvark. Tubulidentata are characterised by their teeth which lack a pulp cavity and form thin tubes which are continuously worn down and replaced.

Family: Orycteropodidae
Genus: Orycteropus
 Aardvark, O. afer

Order: Hyracoidea (hyraxes) 

The hyraxes are any of four species of fairly small, thickset, herbivorous mammals in the order Hyracoidea. About the size of a domestic cat they are well-furred, with rounded bodies and a stumpy tail. They are native to Africa and the Middle East.

Family: Procaviidae (hyraxes)
Genus: Heterohyrax
 Yellow-spotted rock hyrax, Heterohyrax brucei LC

Order: Proboscidea (elephants) 

The elephants comprise three living species and are the largest living land animals.
Family: Elephantidae (elephants)
Genus: Loxodonta
African bush elephant, L. africana

Order: Primates 

The order Primates contains humans and their closest relatives: lemurs, lorisoids, tarsiers, monkeys, and apes.

Suborder: Strepsirrhini
Infraorder: Lemuriformes
Superfamily: Lorisoidea
Family: Galagidae
Genus: Galago
 Mohol bushbaby, Galago moholi LR/lc
Genus: Galagoides
 Prince Demidoff's bushbaby, Galagoides demidovii LR/lc
 Grant's bushbaby, Galagoides granti DD
 Malawi bushbaby, Galagoides nyasae DD
 Thomas's bushbaby, Galagoides thomasi LR/lc
 Zanzibar bushbaby, Galagoides zanzibaricus LR/nt
Genus: Otolemur
 Brown greater galago, Otolemur crassicaudatus LR/lc
Suborder: Haplorhini
Infraorder: Simiiformes
Parvorder: Catarrhini
Superfamily: Cercopithecoidea
Family: Cercopithecidae (Old World monkeys)
Genus: Chlorocebus
 Vervet monkey, Chlorocebus pygerythrus LR/lc
Genus: Cercopithecus
 Blue monkey, Cercopithecus mitis LR/lc
Genus: Papio
 Yellow baboon, Papio cynocephalus LR/lc
 Chacma baboon, Papio ursinus LR/lc
Subfamily: Colobinae
Genus: Colobus
 Angola colobus, Colobus angolensis LR/lc

Order: Rodentia (rodents) 

Rodents make up the largest order of mammals, with over 40% of mammalian species. They have two incisors in the upper and lower jaw which grow continually and must be kept short by gnawing.

Suborder: Hystricognathi
Family: Bathyergidae
Genus: Cryptomys
 Common mole-rat, Cryptomys hottentotus LC
 Mechow's mole-rat, Cryptomys mechowi LC
Genus: Heliophobius
 Silvery mole-rat, Heliophobius argenteocinereus LC
Family: Hystricidae (Old World porcupines)
Genus: Hystrix
 Cape porcupine, Hystrix africaeaustralis LC
Family: Thryonomyidae (cane rats)
Genus: Thryonomys
 Lesser cane rat, Thryonomys gregorianus LC
Suborder: Sciurognathi
Family: Anomaluridae
Subfamily: Anomalurinae
Genus: Anomalurus
 Lord Derby's scaly-tailed squirrel, Anomalurus derbianus LC
Family: Sciuridae (squirrels)
Subfamily: Xerinae
Tribe: Protoxerini
Genus: Heliosciurus
 Mutable sun squirrel, Heliosciurus mutabilis LC
Genus: Paraxerus
 Smith's bush squirrel, Paraxerus cepapi LC
 Striped bush squirrel, Paraxerus flavovittis DD
 Black and red bush squirrel, Paraxerus lucifer DD
 Red bush squirrel, Paraxerus palliatus LC
Family: Gliridae (dormice)
Subfamily: Graphiurinae
Genus: Graphiurus
 Johnston's African dormouse, Graphiurus johnstoni DD
 Small-eared dormouse, Graphiurus microtis LC
Family: Nesomyidae
Subfamily: Dendromurinae
Genus: Dendromus
 Gray climbing mouse, Dendromus melanotis LC
 Brants's climbing mouse, Dendromus mesomelas LC
 Chestnut climbing mouse, Dendromus mystacalis LC
 Nyika climbing mouse, Dendromus nyikae LC
Genus: Steatomys
 Fat mouse, Steatomys pratensis LC
Subfamily: Cricetomyinae
Genus: Beamys
 Greater hamster-rat, Beamys major NT
Genus: Cricetomys
 Gambian pouched rat, Cricetomys gambianus LC
Genus: Saccostomus
 South African pouched mouse, Saccostomus campestris LC
Family: Muridae (mice, rats, voles, gerbils, hamsters, etc.)
Subfamily: Deomyinae
Genus: Acomys
 Spiny mouse, Acomys spinosissimus LC
Genus: Lophuromys
 Yellow-spotted brush-furred rat, Lophuromys flavopunctatus LC
Genus: Uranomys
 Rudd's mouse, Uranomys ruddi LC
Subfamily: Otomyinae
Genus: Otomys
 Angoni vlei rat, Otomys angoniensis LC
 Dent's vlei rat, Otomys denti NT
 Tanzanian vlei rat, Otomys lacustris NT
 Uzungwe vlei rat, Otomys uzungwensis EN
Subfamily: Gerbillinae
Genus: Tatera
 Boehm's gerbil, Tatera boehmi LC
 Bushveld gerbil, Tatera leucogaster LC
Subfamily: Murinae
Genus: Aethomys
 Red rock rat, Aethomys chrysophilus LC
 Kaiser's rock rat, Aethomys kaiseri LC
 Namaqua rock rat, Aethomys namaquensis LC
 Nyika rock rat, Aethomys nyikae LC
Genus: Arvicanthis
 African grass rat, Arvicanthis niloticus LC
Genus: Dasymys
 African marsh rat, Dasymys incomtus LC
Genus: Grammomys
 Woodland thicket rat, Grammomys dolichurus LC
 Ruwenzori thicket rat, Grammomys ibeanus LC
Genus: Hylomyscus
 Montane wood mouse, Hylomyscus denniae LC
Genus: Lemniscomys
 Single-striped grass mouse, Lemniscomys rosalia LC
 Typical striped grass mouse, Lemniscomys striatus LC
Genus: Mastomys
 Natal multimammate mouse, Mastomys natalensis LC
Genus: Mus
 African pygmy mouse, Mus minutoides LC
 Gray-bellied pygmy mouse, Mus triton LC
Genus: Mylomys
 African groove-toothed rat, Mylomys dybowskii LC
Genus: Pelomys
 Creek groove-toothed swamp rat, Pelomys fallax LC
Genus: Praomys
 Delectable soft-furred mouse, Praomys delectorum NT
Genus: Rhabdomys
 Four-striped grass mouse, Rhabdomys pumilio LC
Genus: Thallomys
 Acacia rat, Thallomys paedulcus LC
Genus: Zelotomys
 Hildegarde's broad-headed mouse, Zelotomys hildegardeae LC

Order: Lagomorpha (lagomorphs) 

The lagomorphs comprise two families, Leporidae (hares and rabbits), and Ochotonidae (pikas). Though they can resemble rodents, and were classified as a superfamily in that order until the early 20th century, they have since been considered a separate order. They differ from rodents in a number of physical characteristics, such as having four incisors in the upper jaw rather than two.

Family: Leporidae (rabbits, hares)
Genus: Pronolagus
 Smith's red rock hare, Pronolagus rupestris LR/lc

Order: Erinaceomorpha (hedgehogs and gymnures) 

The order Erinaceomorpha contains a single family, Erinaceidae, which comprise the hedgehogs and gymnures. The hedgehogs are easily recognised by their spines while gymnures look more like large rats.

Family: Erinaceidae (hedgehogs)
Subfamily: Erinaceinae
Genus: Atelerix
 Four-toed hedgehog, Atelerix albiventris LR/lc

Order: Soricomorpha (shrews, moles, and solenodons) 

The "shrew-forms" are insectivorous mammals. The shrews and solenodons closely resemble mice while the moles are stout-bodied burrowers.

Family: Soricidae (shrews)
Subfamily: Crocidurinae
Genus: Crocidura
 Reddish-gray musk shrew, Crocidura cyanea LC
 Bicolored musk shrew, Crocidura fuscomurina LC
 Lesser red musk shrew, Crocidura hirta LC
 Moonshine shrew, Crocidura luna LC
 Lesser gray-brown musk shrew, Crocidura silacea LC
 Turbo shrew, Crocidura turba LC
Genus: Suncus
 Greater dwarf shrew, Suncus lixus LC
 Lesser dwarf shrew, Suncus varilla LC
Genus: Sylvisorex
 Climbing shrew, Sylvisorex megalura LC

Order: Chiroptera (bats) 

The bats' most distinguishing feature is that their forelimbs are developed as wings, making them the only mammals capable of flight. Bat species account for about 20% of all mammals.
Family: Pteropodidae (flying foxes, Old World fruit bats)
Subfamily: Pteropodinae
Genus: Eidolon
 Straw-coloured fruit bat, Eidolon helvum LC
Genus: Epomophorus
 Peters's epauletted fruit bat, Epomophorus crypturus LC
 Ethiopian epauletted fruit bat, Epomophorus labiatus LC
 Wahlberg's epauletted fruit bat, Epomophorus wahlbergi LC
Genus: Epomops
 Dobson's epauletted fruit bat, Epomops dobsoni LC
Genus: Plerotes
 D'Anchieta's fruit bat, Plerotes anchietae DD
Genus: Rousettus
 Egyptian fruit bat, Rousettus aegyptiacus LC
 Long-haired rousette, Rousettus lanosus LC
Family: Vespertilionidae
Subfamily: Kerivoulinae
Genus: Kerivoula
 Damara woolly bat, Kerivoula argentata LC
 Lesser woolly bat, Kerivoula lanosa LC
Subfamily: Myotinae
Genus: Myotis
 Rufous mouse-eared bat, Myotis bocagii LC
 Cape hairy bat, Myotis tricolor LC
 Welwitsch's bat, Myotis welwitschii LC
Subfamily: Vespertilioninae
Genus: Eptesicus
 Long-tailed house bat, Eptesicus hottentotus LC
Genus: Glauconycteris
 Silvered bat, Glauconycteris argentata LC
 Butterfly bat, Glauconycteris variegata LC
Genus: Laephotis
 Botswanan long-eared bat, Laephotis botswanae LC
Genus: Neoromicia
 Cape serotine, Neoromicia capensis LC
 Yellow serotine, Neoromicia flavescens DD
 Melck's house bat, Neoromicia melckorum DD
 Banana pipistrelle, Neoromicia nanus LC
 Rendall's serotine, Neoromicia rendalli LC
 Somali serotine, Neoromicia somalicus LC
 Zulu serotine, Neoromicia zuluensis LC
Genus: Nycticeinops
 Schlieffen's bat, Nycticeinops schlieffeni LC
Genus: Pipistrellus
 Rüppell's pipistrelle, Pipistrellus rueppelli LC
 Rusty pipistrelle, Pipistrellus rusticus LC
Genus: Scotoecus
 White-bellied lesser house bat, Scotoecus albigula DD
 Light-winged lesser house bat, Scotoecus albofuscus DD
 Hinde's lesser house bat, Scotoecus hindei DD
 Dark-winged lesser house bat, Scotoecus hirundo DD
Genus: Scotophilus
 African yellow bat, Scotophilus dinganii LC
 Schreber's yellow bat, Scotophilus nigrita NT
 Greenish yellow bat, Scotophilus viridis LC
Subfamily: Miniopterinae
Genus: Miniopterus
 Lesser long-fingered bat, Miniopterus fraterculus LC
 Natal long-fingered bat, Miniopterus natalensis NT
Family: Molossidae
Genus: Chaerephon
 Nigerian free-tailed bat, Chaerephon nigeriae LC
 Little free-tailed bat, Chaerephon pumila LC
Genus: Mops
 Angolan free-tailed bat, Mops condylurus LC
 Midas free-tailed bat, Mops midas LC
Genus: Otomops
 Large-eared free-tailed bat, Otomops martiensseni NT
Genus: Tadarida
 Madagascan large free-tailed bat, Tadarida fulminans LC
 African giant free-tailed bat, Tadarida ventralis NT
Family: Emballonuridae
Genus: Taphozous
 Mauritian tomb bat, Taphozous mauritianus LC
Family: Nycteridae
Genus: Nycteris
 Large slit-faced bat, Nycteris grandis LC
 Hairy slit-faced bat, Nycteris hispida LC
 Large-eared slit-faced bat, Nycteris macrotis LC
 Egyptian slit-faced bat, Nycteris thebaica LC
 Wood's slit-faced bat, Nycteris woodi NT
Family: Megadermatidae
Genus: Lavia
 Yellow-winged bat, Lavia frons LC
Family: Rhinolophidae
Subfamily: Rhinolophinae
Genus: Rhinolophus
Blasius's horseshoe bat, R. blasii 
 Geoffroy's horseshoe bat, Rhinolophus clivosus LC
 Darling's horseshoe bat, Rhinolophus darlingi LC
 Rüppell's horseshoe bat, Rhinolophus fumigatus LC
 Hildebrandt's horseshoe bat, Rhinolophus hildebrandti LC
 Lander's horseshoe bat, Rhinolophus landeri LC
 Bushveld horseshoe bat, Rhinolophus simulator LC
Subfamily: Hipposiderinae
Genus: Hipposideros
 Sundevall's roundleaf bat, Hipposideros caffer LC
 Noack's roundleaf bat, Hipposideros ruber LC
Genus: Triaenops
 Persian trident bat, Triaenops persicus LC

Order: Pholidota (pangolins) 

The order Pholidota comprises the eight species of pangolin. Pangoblins are anteaters and have the powerful claws, elongated snout and long tongue seen in the other unrelated anteater species.

Family: Manidae
Genus: Smutsia
 Ground pangolin, S. temminckii

Order: Carnivora (carnivorans) 

There are over 260 species of carnivorans, the majority of which feed primarily on meat. They have a characteristic skull shape and dentition.
Suborder: Feliformia
Family: Felidae (cats)
Subfamily: Felinae
Genus: Caracal
Caracal, C. caracal 
Genus: Leptailurus
 Serval, Leptailurus serval LC
Subfamily: Pantherinae
Genus: Panthera
Lion, Panthera leo VU
Leopard, Panthera pardus VU
Family: Viverridae
Subfamily: Viverrinae
Genus: Civettictis
African civet, C. civetta 
Genus: Genetta
 Angolan genet, Genetta angolensis LC
 Rusty-spotted genet, Genetta maculata LC
Family: Nandiniidae
Genus: Nandinia
 African palm civet, Nandinia binotata LC
Family: Herpestidae (mongooses)
Genus: Atilax
 Marsh mongoose, Atilax paludinosus LC
Genus: Bdeogale
Bushy-tailed mongoose, B. crassicauda 
Genus: Helogale
 Common dwarf mongoose, Helogale parvula LC
Genus: Herpestes
 Egyptian mongoose, Herpestes ichneumon LC
Common slender mongoose, Herpestes sanguineus LC
Genus: Mungos
 Banded mongoose, Mungos mungo LC
Genus: Paracynictis
 Selous' mongoose, Paracynictis selousi LC
Genus: Rhynchogale
 Meller's mongoose, Rhynchogale melleri LC
Family: Hyaenidae (hyaenas)
Genus: Crocuta
 Spotted hyena, Crocuta crocuta LC
Genus: Parahyaena
 Brown hyena, Parahyaena brunnea LC
Suborder: Caniformia
Family: Canidae (dogs, foxes)
Genus: Lupulella
 Side-striped jackal, L. adusta  
Genus: Lycaon
African wild dog, Lycaon pictus EN
Family: Mustelidae (mustelids)
Genus: Ictonyx
 Striped polecat, Ictonyx striatus LC
Genus: Poecilogale
 African striped weasel, Poecilogale albinucha LC
Genus: Mellivora
 Honey badger, M. capensis 
Genus: Hydrictis
Spotted-necked otter, Hydrictis maculicollis LC
Genus: Aonyx
 African clawless otter, Aonyx capensis LC

Order: Perissodactyla (odd-toed ungulates) 

The odd-toed ungulates are browsing and grazing mammals. They are usually large to very large, and have relatively simple stomachs and a large middle toe.

Family: Equidae (horses etc.)
Genus: Equus
Plains zebra, E. quagga 
Crawshay's zebra, E. q. crawshayi 
Family: Rhinocerotidae
Genus: Diceros
Black rhinoceros, D. bicornis
South-central black rhinoceros, D. b. minor  reintroduced

Order: Artiodactyla (even-toed ungulates) 

The even-toed ungulates are ungulates whose weight is borne about equally by the third and fourth toes, rather than mostly or entirely by the third as in perissodactyls. There are about 220 artiodactyl species, including many that are of great economic importance to humans.
Family: Suidae (pigs)
Subfamily: Phacochoerinae
Genus: Phacochoerus
 Common warthog, Phacochoerus africanus
Subfamily: Suinae
Genus: Potamochoerus
 Bushpig, Potamochoerus larvatus
Family: Hippopotamidae (hippopotamuses)
Genus: Hippopotamus
Hippopotamus, H. amphibius  
Family: Giraffidae (giraffe, okapi)
Genus: Giraffa
 Giraffe, Giraffa camelopardalis VU extirpated, vagrant
Family: Bovidae (cattle, antelope, sheep, goats)
Subfamily: Alcelaphinae
Genus: Alcelaphus
 Lichtenstein's hartebeest, Alcelaphus lichtensteinii
Genus: Connochaetes
 Blue wildebeest, Connochaetes taurinus
Subfamily: Antilopinae
Genus: Neotragus
 Suni, Neotragus moschatus
Genus: Oreotragus
 Klipspringer, Oreotragus oreotragus
Genus: Ourebia
 Oribi, Ourebia ourebi
Genus: Raphicerus
 Sharpe's grysbok, Raphicerus sharpei
 Steenbok, Raphicerus campestris
Subfamily: Bovinae
Genus: Syncerus
African buffalo, S. caffer 
Genus: Tragelaphus
Nyala, Tragelaphus angasii
 Common eland, Tragelaphus oryx
Cape bushbuck, Tragelaphus scriptus
 Greater kudu, Tragelaphus strepsiceros
Subfamily: Cephalophinae
Genus: Cephalophus
 Blue duiker, Cephalophus monticola
 Red forest duiker, Cephalophus natalensis
Genus: Sylvicapra
 Common duiker, Sylvicapra grimmia
Subfamily: Hippotraginae
Genus: Hippotragus
 Roan antelope, Hippotragus equinus
 Sable antelope, Hippotragus niger
Subfamily: Aepycerotinae
Genus: Aepyceros
 Impala, Aepyceros melampus
Subfamily: Reduncinae
Genus: Kobus
 Waterbuck, Kobus ellipsiprymnus
 Puku, Kobus vardonii
Genus: Redunca
 Southern reedbuck, Redunca arundinum

See also
List of chordate orders
Lists of mammals by region
List of prehistoric mammals
Mammal classification
List of mammals described in the 2000s

Notes

References
 

Malawi
Malawi
Mammals